The Ashburton River / Hakatere is a river in the Canterbury region of New Zealand, flowing across Mid Canterbury from the Southern Alps to the Pacific Ocean. The official name of the river was amended to become a dual name by the Ngāi Tahu Claims Settlement Act 1998.  It has been identified as an Important Bird Area by BirdLife International because it supports breeding colonies of the endangered black-billed gull.

Description
The river has two branches which meet  from the coast, just inland of the town of Ashburton. The rivers' path southeast across the Canterbury Plains lies in a shallow depression between the higher shingle fans created by the much larger Rakaia and Rangitata rivers. Both branches are crossed via siphons by the Rangitata Diversion Race, part of an irrigation scheme.

The river separates Ashburton from its southern suburb, Tinwald. Both river and town are named for Bingham Baring, 2nd Baron Ashburton, who was a leading member of the Canterbury Association.

North branch

The Ashburton River North Branch / Hakatere flows from the slopes of Godley Peak in the Palmer Range. The uppermost reach of the river is known as Petticoat lane. The river flows south then southwest through narrow scree-sided valleys with almost no areas of river flats. The Black Hills Range and Pudding Hill Range lie to the northeast and the Alford Range to the southwest. The river emerges from the hills adjacent to Pudding Hill airfield.

South branch

It initially flows southeast down a narrow valley between the Big Hill Range and the Wild Man's Brother Range.  from source the river trends south, turning southeast again to cross the flat Hakatere Valley where the outflows of several small lakes (collectively known as the Ashburton Lakes) join it. The river exits the valley via the Ashburton Gorge, with the Moorhouse Range to the south and the Clent Hills and Winterslow Range to the north, emerging onto the Canterbury Plains at Mount Somers then flowing east towards Ashburton Forks.

References

Rivers of Canterbury, New Zealand
Important Bird Areas of New Zealand
Rivers of New Zealand